Gomer Pyle, U.S.M.C. is an American situation comedy that originally aired on CBS from September 25, 1964, to May 2, 1969. The series was a spin-off of The Andy Griffith Show, and the pilot episode was aired as the season finale of the fourth season of its parent series on May 18, 1964. The show ran for a total of 150 half-hour episodes spanning over five seasons, in black-and-white for the first season, and then in color for the remaining four seasons. In 2006, CBS Home Entertainment (distributed by Paramount) began releasing the series on DVD. The final season was released in November 2008.

Like its parent series, Gomer Pyle, U.S.M.C. was also a major ratings hit, never placing lower than tenth in the Nielsen ratings, and ended its run as the second-highest-rated series in the United States. It has enjoyed continued popularity through reruns and DVD releases. The series was created by Aaron Ruben, who also produced the show with Sheldon Leonard and Ronald Jacobs. Filmed and set in California, it stars Jim Nabors as Gomer Pyle, a naïve but good-natured gas station attendant from the town of Mayberry, North Carolina, who enlists in the United States Marine Corps. Frank Sutton plays Gomer's high-octane, short-fused Gunnery Sergeant Vince Carter, and Ronnie Schell plays Gomer's friend Duke Slater. Roy Stuart portrayed Corporal Chuck Boyle, GySgt Carter's good-natured sidekick. Allan Melvin played in the recurring role of Gunnery Sergeant Carter's rival, Staff Sergeant Charley Hacker.

History

Everett Greenbaum and Jim Fritzell, writers for The Andy Griffith Show, are credited with creating the character of Gomer Pyle. The character was based on an "incompetent" gas station attendant whom Greenbaum met and named after Gomer Cool (a writer) and Denver Pyle (an actor on The Andy Griffith Show). Jim Nabors was cast to play Gomer; he had been performing for a Santa Monica nightclub, The Horn, when Andy Griffith discovered him. Though originally intended to appear in only one episode, Gomer proved popular, and after appearing in seasons 3 and 4, Nabors was given his own spin-off produced by Aaron Ruben. The pilot episode of Gomer Pyle was filmed in 1963 as part of The Andy Griffith Show, but was not aired until 1964, as the finale of The Andy Griffith Shows fourth season.

The 1960s saw a return to "the more mundane sensibilities of comedy," due to viewers' wishes for television programming to be a "cultural antidepressant." Thus, fantasy- and rurally-oriented comedies gained popularity and dominated the Nielsen ratings. Like other comedies at the time, Gomer Pyle was a "deep escapist" show; it avoided political commentary and offered viewers a distraction from the social changes of the 1960s. Despite being a military-themed show and airing during the peak of the Vietnam War, the show never discussed the war. Instead, the show was founded on "Gomer's innocent simplicity [and] Sergeant Carter's frustration and later concern for Gomer's well-being." This, compounded with the popularity of rural comedies in the 1960s, made the show popular. Frank Sutton, who played Carter, ascribed the show's popularity to its concentration on its two main characters, and the plots being built around their respective personalities. The program remained in the top 10 of the ratings throughout its run—in the top three for all but its third season when CBS moved it from Fridays to Wednesdays. Nabors quit because he desired to move to something else, "reach for another rung on the ladder, either up or down."

After Gomer Pyle left the air, Jim Nabors hosted his own variety show, The Jim Nabors Hour, from 1969 to 1971. As well as showcasing Nabors' singing and rich baritone voice, the show included comedy sketches that featured Nabors's Gomer Pyle co-stars Frank Sutton and Ronnie Schell. Though told that he should not leave Gomer Pyle, Nabors felt that the show would still be exciting and noted that every character he portrayed in his sketches "turn[ed] out to be Gomer."

Production

The show was produced by creator Aaron Ruben, Andy Griffith Show producer Sheldon Leonard (in partnership with Griffith), and Ronald Jacobs; it was co-produced by Bruce Bayley Johnson and Duke Vincent. Among the writers were Sam Bobrick, Harvey Miller, Aaron Ruben, Jack Elinson, and Bill Idelson; Andy Griffith Show writers Everett Greenbaum and Jim Fritzell also wrote episodes. Coby Ruskin was the primary director in the first four seasons, before John Rich took over the role for the fifth season; other directors included Gary Nelson, Peter Baldwin, and Alan Rafkin. Ruth Burch was in charge of the casting, and John Finger directed the cinematography. The theme song was composed by Earle Hagen, who also composed the themes for shows such as The Andy Griffith Show, The Dick Van Dyke Show, and That Girl.

The show was filmed at Camp Pendleton, Desilu Studios's Desilu-Cahuenga, and RKO Forty Acres backlot, where The Andy Griffith Show was filmed. Though Ruben preferred the use of a multiple-camera setup for comedy programs, Gomer Pyle used a single-camera setup because much of the shooting was conducted outdoors. In his book And The Show Goes On, Sheldon Leonard explained that the armed forces offer levels of "cooperation" with filmmakers. Because the Marines felt that the show would be good for the branch's image, Gomer Pyle was given "total cooperation," meaning that the show was allowed unlimited access to military equipment.

The vehicles in the show were provided by the Chrysler Corporation, as opposed to the parent series' vehicles that came from the Ford Motor Company. Although Jeeps are also prominent in the show, the brand itself would not become a part of Chrysler until the AMC buyout that occurred in 1987.

Nabors and Sutton were the only actors credited in every episode (however, Sutton did not appear in every episode). Ronnie Schell (who played Duke Slater) left after the third season to star in Good Morning World, though he returned for the fifth season, promoted to corporal, after graduating from non-commissioned officer training. Roy Stuart, who played Corporal Chuck Boyle, made his debut in the second season and left after the fourth. Andy Griffith, Frances Bavier, Ron Howard, and George Lindsey made guest appearances on the series reprising their respective roles from The Andy Griffith Show. Denver Pyle and Allan Melvin, who both had roles on The Andy Griffith Show, appeared in Gomer Pyle, but did not reprise their original roles. Denver Pyle, who had played Briscoe Darling in six episodes of The Andy Griffith Show, played tomato farmer Titus Purcell in the Gomer Pyle episode "The Price of Tomatoes." Allan Melvin, who had played Clarence "Doc" Malloy and other antagonists on The Andy Griffith Show, played Sergeant Carter's rival, Staff Sergeant Hacker, for four seasons. Nabors also carried the Gomer Pyle character to fellow CBS series The Lucy Show, in which he made a cameo appearance in a 1966 episode.

Nabors always said he had a hard time watching the shows opening credits, as many of the Marines he was filmed training with were later killed in Vietnam.

Episodes

Premise

The premise of Gomer Pyle is similar to and perhaps inspired by Andy Griffith's starring role in the Broadway play and film version of No Time for Sergeants, which was based on the Mac Hyman novel of the same title. Like Leonard's other shows, Gomer Pyle was character-driven; the main characters were "accessible" and "engaging," and the supporting characters were often eccentric. In the show's pilot episode, Gomer, a gas-station attendant from Mayberry, joins the Marines. Gomer's naivete immediately exasperates his drill instructor, Gunnery Sergeant Carter (Frank Sutton). Originally situated in Camp Wilson in North Carolina, the setting was moved to the fictional Camp Henderson in California. The show was a fish-out-of-water piece, which, like its contemporary The Beverly Hillbillies, featured rural characters out of their normal settings. Like other comedies of the 1960s, the show avoided political commentary (especially concerning the Vietnam War) and focused instead on the predicaments that ensued from Gomer's unintentional breaking of the rules or sticking his foot in his mouth.

Among the themes explored were the honesty and "strong family values supposedly inherent in small-town life"; according to author Gerard Jones, Gomer Pyle'''s basic message was "far simpler than any corporate suburban sitcoms with their lessons in compromise and role-following [...] It said merely that the oldest, most basic, least sophisticated sort of sweetness could redeem even the toughest modern types".Newcomb, pp. 113–115 Author Elizabeth Hirschman noted that Gomer represented a "uniquely American archetype"—a "large, powerful man physically" with the "simple, honest nature of a child or animal". She also noted that, like stories with characters of such an archetype, Gomer's trusting nature was often taken advantage of, though in the end he "reaps happiness" because of his innocence. In his book Watching M*A*S*H, Watching America, media and communications scholar James Wittebols said that Gomer Pyle illustrated how class differences "supposedly negated or diminished by military training" made themselves apparent in the military world.

Characters

Gomer Pyle (played by Jim Nabors), from Mayberry, North Carolina, is a good-natured and innocent private whose naïvete constantly annoys his drill instructor, Sergeant Carter. Eventually, however, his "unquestioning love and trust of the world" lead those in his platoon to befriend him. His good nature attracts the friendship of women; meanwhile, in so far as Carter's abrasiveness repels women, Gomer is in the position of salvaging numerous social occasions by charming the women whose opinions are important to officers at the Marine base. Gomer was created as a stereotype of a rural American; according to Time, he "wears a gee-whiz expression, spouts homilies out of a lopsided mouth and lopes around uncertainly like a plowboy stepping through a field of cow dung. He is a walking disaster area." Though never promoted beyond private first class during the show's run, Jim Nabors (who played Gomer) was given an honorary promotion to lance corporal in 2001, to corporal in 2007, and then to sergeant in 2013 by the Marines.

Vince Carter (played by Frank Sutton), a gunnery sergeant from Kansas, is Gomer's irritable, abrasive, and socially inept drill instructor (later his platoon sergeant) who is constantly annoyed by Gomer's well-intentioned mistakes. Carter disdains Gomer's country idiosyncrasies ("golly!" "Shazam!" "surprise, surprise, surprise!"). He is also put off by Gomer's expectation that the platoon should be a family, of which Carter is the father figure: As much as Carter wants their working relationship to be temporary, as is common in the military, Gomer expects a life-long friendship, which exasperates Carter. Due to the audience's demand for more family-oriented programming, he eventually revealed his softer side: Carter became a father figure to Gomer as well as his best friend. Sutton stated that his character was created "out of whole cloth for the show" and, as the actor played him "by ear," Carter greatly changed during the first season. Barbara Stuart played his girlfriend "Miss Bunny" for three seasons.

Mark Slade appeared in eight episodes in 1964 in the role of "Eddie" though in the first of those appearances he was billed as "Private Swanson."

Duke Slater (played by Ronnie Schell) is Gomer's friend and platoon-mate. Schell left the show in the fourth season to star in the short-lived show Good Morning, World but returned in the final season as the corporal of Gomer's platoon.

Chuck Boyle (played by Roy Stuart) is Gomer's corporal. He often serves as Carter's conscience and sticks up for Gomer when Sergeant Carter is annoyed over his mistakes. Stuart debuted in the second season and left the show after the fourth season; Boyle was replaced by Duke Slater as corporal for the final season.

Lou-Ann Poovie (played by Elizabeth MacRae) is Gomer's girlfriend. She debuts in the third season as a singer for a nightclub, but leaves the job at Gomer's urging to return home to Turtle Creek, North Carolina, and marry her beau Monroe Efford. In a later episode in the same season, she returns to California and reveals that she called the wedding off. At the end of the episode, she reveals that she wants Gomer to be her boyfriend, to the dismay of Carter and Duke. After she loses her job at the nightclub, Gomer finds her a job as a salesclerk at a record shop.

Ratings and timeslots

Legacy
In the song "Nobody Home" from Pink Floyd's 1979 album The Wall, an audio clip of Pyle saying his signature line "Surprise, surprise, surprise!" can be heard.

Media
E. Kitzes Knox wrote a novel based on the series, also titled Gomer Pyle, U.S.M.C. The paperback was published by Pyramid and released in 1966. Jim Nabors recorded Shazam!, which is not a soundtrack of the show but features Jim singing novelty songs in his "Gomer" voice, and released it on the Columbia Records label.

Home media
CBS DVD (distributed by Paramount Home Entertainment) has released all five seasons of Gomer Pyle, U.S.M.C. on DVD in Region 1.  All episodes have been fully restored and digitally remastered in full-color, but due to clearance issues, some episodes that feature Nabors (and other cast members) singing have been edited to remove those performances.

On March 10, 2015, CBS DVD (distributed by Paramount) released Gomer Pyle, U.S.M.C.- The Complete series'' on DVD in Region 1.

In Region 4, Shock Entertainment has released all five seasons on DVD in Australia.

Explanatory notes

Citations

General bibliography

Further reading

External links

 
 

1964 American television series debuts
1969 American television series endings
1960s American sitcoms
American television spin-offs
Black-and-white American television shows
CBS original programming
English-language television shows
Military comedy television series
Television shows set in North Carolina
Television shows set in California
Television series by CBS Studios
Television shows about the United States Marine Corps
The Andy Griffith Show